McMaster University Bus Terminal is a bus terminal located at McMaster University in Hamilton, Ontario, Canada.  The terminal is situated between the Mary E. Keyes Residence and H. G. Thode Library. GO Transit exclusively uses the terminal, while Hamilton Street Railway provides connecting routes. The terminal opened on April 5, 2007, with full accessibility and includes five bus bays, three heated shelters, and large platforms.

Services

GO Transit
Platform assignments
1 - Hamilton GO Centre (westbound route 47)
2 - Aldershot "train meet" connection (route 15/15A eastbound) to Lakeshore West GO Train service
2 - Brantford "train meet" connection (route 15 westbound)
3 - Route 47F to Highway 407 Bus Termial
4 - Square One/Bramalea Express (routes 47A & 47B)
5 - Hwy 407 to Highway 407 Bus Terminal (eastbound route 47)

Hamilton Street Railway 
Hamilton Street Railway (HSR) has several local bus routes that operate through the campus or on Main Street:
1/1A - King
5/52 - Delaware
10 - B line Express (no Sunday or holiday service)
51 - University (no Sunday or holiday service)

References

External links

McMaster University
McMaster
Transport buildings and structures in Hamilton, Ontario
Transport infrastructure completed in 2007
2007 establishments in Ontario